Ayatollah Abdol-Hamid Masoumi-Tehrani is an Iranian cleric based in Tehran, Iran. Masoumi-Tehrani was born in Tehran to a distinguished cleric family and attained the rank of Ayatollah. Masoumi-Tehrani is an accomplished calligrapher and spends much of his time engaged in this profession as he believes that money should not be made through religion. He strongly advocates human rights for all regardless of religious ideology or belief and has created in calligraphy from the Torah, Psalms and Quran to foster unity amongst religions.

Masoumi-Tehrani has been pressured by authorities, detained, and imprisoned on various occasions, starting when he was 23. He claims to have been questioned even by agents of reformist president Mohammad Khatami regarding his project to publish calligraphy of the Torah, and that beginning in 2004 he received threats connected to his similar project for the Psalms.

In April 2014, as a mark of solidarity with the Baháʼí community of Iran, the largest religious minority in the country, he gifted the Baháʼís of the world a calligraphy work from the writings of Bahá'u'lláh, the prophet founder of the Baháʼí Faith, which states:  "Consort with all religions with amity and concord, that they may inhale from you the sweet fragrance of God. Beware lest amidst men the flame of foolish ignorance overpower you. All things proceed from God and unto Him they return. He is the source of all things and in Him all things are ended."  The Ayatollah's call for religious tolerance and co-existence has received worldwide support from religious leaders.

In November 2015, Masoumi-Tehrani gave 15 recently arrested Baháʼís in Iran another calligraphy work he produced. It featured a quotation from The Hidden Words, one of the Baháʼí Faith's sacred texts: "O Son Of Man! Ponder and reflect. Is it thy wish to die upon thy bed, or to shed thy life-blood on the dust, a martyr in My path, and so become the manifestation of My command and the revealer of My light in the highest paradise? Judge thou aright, O servant!"  He said he wished to raise awareness among Iranians about the dignity of people regardless of religion.

In 2021, Tehrani gave an interview to Israeli television from Tehran, said that “Iranians and Jews have many years of friendship" and declared that he hasn't met Iranians who don’t have a positive opinion of Israel. He called for an end for "illogical hostility between the Iranian and Israeli peoples".

See also
 List of Ayatollahs

References 

Year of birth missing (living people)
Living people
Iranian ayatollahs
People from Tehran
Iranian calligraphers
Muslim supporters of Israel